Athletics at the 2020 Summer Paralympics were to be held at the Tokyo National Stadium between 25 August and 6 September. Following the COVID-19 pandemic they have been rescheduled to between 24 August and 5 September 2021.

Timeline
As of March 2021.

Qualification
Allocations of qualification slots are awarded to the individual athlete, not to the NPC.
 Maximum number of slots awarded to an NPC is 45 male qualification slots and 35 female qualification slots (80 total slots). However, exception may be granted through the Bipartite Commission Invitation Allocation method which starts in early May 2021.
 An NPC can enter a maximum of three eligible athletes per medal event.
 An NPC can enter one team (four athletes per team) in a relay event.
 An NPC can enter a maximum of six eligible athletes in each marathon event - only three athletes can enter in one medal event as their only event.
 During the 2019 World Championships, the top four ranked athletes in each individual medal event (excluding marathon events) will achieve one qualification slot.

Athlete eligibility
 Athletes have to achieve one minimum entry standard (MES) performance at any World Para Athletics recognised competitions between 1 October 2018 to 1 August 2021 as shown in the qualified slots.
 During the 2019 World Championships, if an athlete is ranked first to fourth in more than one medal event, they can only obtain one qualification slots for their NPC.
 In the Qualification Ranking Allocation, the top six athletes will obtain a qualification slot in each individual medal event.

Event removal
In December 2019, the IPC removed the women's 100m T52 due to the event not meeting the minimum required eligible criteria and lack of competitors: there were only five athletes from four countries who competed at the 2019 World Para Athletics Championships one month earlier. As well as this sprint event, the NPCs were also informed about the men's high jump T64, women's javelin F13 and the universal 4 × 100 m relay because of the issues regarding the minimum eligible criteria, they would removed without replacement events being added to the medal event programme for the Games. The medal events will have 93 male, 73 female and 1 mixed however the athlete quota allocation remains unaffected at 1100 athletes.

Qualified slots

Men's track

100 metres

200 metres

400 metres

800 metres

1500 metres

5000 metres

Marathon

Men's field

Long jump

High jump

Club throw

Discus throw

Javelin throw

Shot put

Women's track

100 metres

200 metres

400 metres

800 metres

1500 metres

5000 metres

Marathon

Women's field

Long jump

Club throw

Discus throw

Javelin throw

Shot put

Mixed events

See also
 Athletics at the 2020 Summer Olympics – Qualification

References